The British Institute of Technology, England (BITE), formerly the British Institute of Technology and E-commerce, is a private educational institute, also involved in consultancy and research, whose main campus is located in the London Borough of Newham, east London, England.

As of 2012, BITE was the 5th largest private higher educational establishment in the UK by number of students.

History

The British Institute of Technology, England was founded in 1999 in Newham, east London. It is as a private educational Institute which is also involved in consultancy and research. BITE has worked on government-funded and private education projects since its foundation.

Campuses and facilities

Stratford Campus
The Institute's Stratford Campus is situated in Romford Road (the A118), 2 miles from Westfield Stratford City and the 2012 Olympic Park. The campus consists of the School of Technology and the School of Commerce contained in two seven-storey buildings, Avicenna House and Kalam House, which also include a library and nanotechnology labs.

Library
The Newton Library is located on the 3rd floor of Kalam House and offers access to ICT integrated with printed and audio-visual resources.

Academic Structure
BITE works in partnership with universities to offer undergraduate and postgraduate provision, including Honours and master's degrees and further education courses.

BITE is subject to annual 'Review for Educational Oversight' inspections by the Quality Assurance Agency for Higher Education; the organisation received a positive review in January 2012 from the body, which expressed confidence in organisation's monitoring and reporting of academic standard quality.

Programmes
BITE's degree programmes are internally designed and validated by UK University partners including London Metropolitan University. The programmes are developed in consultation with business and government sectors to address the gap between industry and higher education. The range of programmes includes master's degrees, covering MBA, LLM, MA and MSc qualifications. At undergraduate level, there are courses focusing on business and technology.

IELTS
BITE is a British Council accredited test centre for the International English Language Testing System (IELTS). The IELTS test is available in two modules – Academic and General Training. The Academic Module is used by candidates for admission to undergraduate or postgraduate courses and for registration with professional bodies. The General Training Module emphasises basic survival skills in a broad social and educational context.

Conferences
Since 2008 BITE has organised a World Hi Tech Forum conference, focusing on a different country each year, including: 2008, India; 2009, China; and in 2010, UAE.

Notes

Private universities in the United Kingdom
Educational organisations based in London
1999 establishments in the United Kingdom
Educational institutions established in 1999
Business organisations based in London